Checkout.com, (with legal name of main entity as Checkout Ltd), is an international financial technology company which processes payments for other companies. Founded as Opus Payments in 2009, it is headquartered in London, United Kingdom. It had a valuation of $40 billion in 2022, making it the most valuable European fintech startup. Customers include Netflix, Pizza Hut, and digital asset exchange Coinbase.

History 
Checkout.com was founded in 2009 by Swiss national Guillaume Pousaz in Singapore under the name Opus Payments, which processed payments for merchants in Hong Kong. The company became profitable in 2011 through a deal with Chinese tech gadget trading website Dealextreme. In 2012, Opus Payments was renamed Checkout.com in and registered in the U.K. In 2013, Checkout.com was granted membership with Visa and Mastercard, and Checkout.com subsequently focused on partnerships with Alipay and WeChat.

In 2018, the company joined London & Partners' Mayor's International Business Programme. In 2019, the company received a $230 million Series A funding round led by Insight Partners and DST Global. After additional funding rounds, the company's valuation had increased to $15 billion by June 2020. In May 2020, it acquired Australian company Pin Payments, allowing Checkout.com to expand into the Australian and New Zealand markets.

In January 2022, the company announced a $1 billion funding round, surpassing the value of competitors such as Revolut and Wise. Investors included the Qatar Investment Authority and Tiger Global Management, among others. The company announced it would use the capital to invest in Web3 applications. In May 2022, Checkout.com announced it was acquiring French startup Ubble which provides a remote identity verification service.

References 

Business software
Companies based in London
Financial technology
Merchant services
Online payments
Payment service providers